Aldwark may refer to the following places in England:

 Aldwark, Derbyshire
 Aldwark, Hambleton, North Yorkshire
 Aldwark (York), a street in North Yorkshire